The European Union Public Licence (EUPL) is a free software licence that was written and approved by the European Commission. The licence is available in 23 official languages of the European Union. All linguistic versions have the same validity. Its latest version, EUPL v1.2, was published in May 2017.

Software, mainly produced by European administrations, has been licensed under the EUPL since the launch of the European Open Source Observatory and Repository (OSOR) in October 2008, now part of Joinup collaborative platform.

History
EUPL was originally intended to be used for the distribution of software developed in the framework of the IDABC programme, given its generic scope it was also suitable for use by any software developer. Its main goal is its focusing on being consistent with the copyright law in the Member States of the European Union, while retaining compatibility with popular free software licences such as the GNU General Public License. The first IDABC software packages mentioned are CIRCA groupware, IPM and the eLink G2G, G2C, G2B specification software.

Comparison to other open source/free software licences
EUPL is the first open source licence to be released by an international governing body. A goal of this licence is to create an open-source licence available into 23 official languages of the European Union, and that is sure to conform to the existing copyright laws of the Member States of the European Union.

The licence was developed with other open-source licences in mind and specifically authorizes covered works to be re-released under the following licences, when combined with their covered code in larger works:

Many other OSI-approved licences are compatible with the EUPL: JOINUP publish a general compatibility matrix between all OSI-approved licences and the EUPL.

An overview of the EUPL licence and on what makes it different has been published in OSS-Watch.

In 2020, the European Commission publishes its Joinup Licensing Assistant, which makes possible the selection and comparison of more than 50 licences, with access to their SPDX identifier and full text.

Versions
EUPL v1.0 was approved on 9 January 2007. 

EUPL v1.1 was approved by the European Commission on 9 January 2009. EUPL v1.1 is OSI certified as from March 2009.

EUPL v1.2 was published in May 2017. EUPL v1.2 is OSI certified in July 2017.

Version 1.2
The EUPL v1.2 was prepared as from June 2013 its decision process started in 2016 and  released on 19 May 2017. A principal objective of the EUPL v1.2 is to update the appendix of compatible licences to cover newer popular licences such as the GNU GPLv3 and AGPLv3. 

According to the EUPL v.1.1, the European Commission may publish other linguistic versions and/or new versions of the EUPL, so far this is required and reasonable, without reducing the scope of the rights granted by the Licence. Future upgrades will not be applicable automatically when software was expressly released "under the EUPL v.1.1 only".

New provisions cover the Application service provider loophole of software distribution: Distribution and/or Communication (of software) includes providing on-line "access to its essential functionalities".

A specificity of the EUPL v1.2 is that, at the contrary of the GPL, it is compatible with all other reciprocal licenses listed in the EUPL appendix. Compatibility means that after merging the covered code with code covered by a compatible license, the resulting (combined) derivative work can be distributed under the compatible license. 

Another specificity of the EUPL is that it is interoperable, without any viral effect in case of static and dynamic linking. This currently depends on European and national law, according to the Computer Programs Directive (Directive 91/250 EEC or 2009/24). Recital 10 of this Directive defines interoperability and recital 15 states that for making two programs interoperable, the code needed can be copied, translated or adapted. For example take program A (new original code just written) and program B (a program licensed by a third party), the developer/licensor of A, who is also a legitimate holder or recipient of B may reproduce in A the needed code from B (e.g. the APIs or the needed data structures from program B) without copyright infringement and without authorization from the copyright holder of B. The licensor of A can do and distribute this without being bonded by conditions or limitations imposed by a licence of program B. This must stay compatible with the normal use of program B and cannot prejudice the legitimate interest of the copyright holder of B. 

Unlike the "articles", the directive "recitals" are not transposed as such in national laws. However, recitals are part of European law: they are serving for understanding the scope and rationale of the law, and will be used by the court for interpreting the law, as the case may be. While recitals in EU Directives and Regulations are not considered to have independent legal value, they can expand an ambiguous provision's scope. They cannot restrict an unambiguous provision's scope, but they can be used to determine the nature of a provision, or to adapt it to new circumstances.

Is the EUPL "Strong Copyleft"?
It is important to make a distinction between the various flavours of the “Strong Copyleft” concept. According to the GPL/AGPL licensor vision, this means some restrictions and conditions regarding interoperability (due to the theory that linking other software with the covered code creates a combined derivative) and regarding compatibility (since no derivative could be licensed under another license, which may create incompatibilities). The EUPL vision that is depending on the EU law is all the contrary: linking makes no derivatives and when merging source code licensed differently is a necessity, the resulting derivative can be licensed under a compatible license. For some of those,
the copyleft is known to be “weaker” (i.e. the MPL), but this has no impact because according to the EUPL the compatible license will prevail when its provisions conflict with those of the EUPL. Since none of the compatible license prohibits the strong reciprocity implemented by the EUPL (obligation to publish and share the source code of derivatives, even distributed through a network) the copyleft resulting from the EUPL can be considered as strong. For this reason, the German lawyer Niklas Plutte created for the EUPL the new category of "Interoperable copyleft licence".

Member states policies
As from 2010, EU member states adopt or revise policies aimed to encourage – when appropriate – the open source distribution of public sector applications. The EUPL is formally mentioned in some of these policies:
 Malta
 Spain
 Estonia: Ministry of Economic Affairs and Communications, Department of State Information Systems. Information Society Yearbook 2009.
 Slovakia
 France: Décret n° 2021-1559 of 1 December 2021, amending the Code of Relations between the Public and the Administration, Article D323-2-1, et seq.

See also

 Software using the European Union Public Licence
 Comparison of free and open-source software licences
 GPL linking exception

References

External links
 
 Full English text of the licence (PDF)
 Legal context and milestones of the elaboration of the EUPL (by Severine Dusollier) (PDF)
 Article of professor Severine Dusollier with a particular reference to the EUPL  (PDF)
 "Speech of Neelie Kroes, Vice President of the European Commission", YouTube video
 "The European Union can show off with its own, free, open source license", Linux magazine
 EUPL - An overview (by Rowan Wilson)
 The European Union Public Licence (by Patrice-Emmanuel Schmitz) - A legal analysis in the IFOSSLR (International Free and Open Source Software Law Review), Vol. 5 n°2 (2013)

Computer law
Copyleft
Copyright law of the European Union
Free content licenses
Free and open-source software licenses
Copyleft software licenses
Information technology organizations based in Europe